Norman Samson Clarke (born 1 April 1942) is a Northern Irish retired football outside left, best remembered for his two spells in the Irish League with Ballymena United.

Career statistics

References

Association footballers from Northern Ireland
NIFL Premiership players
Association football outside forwards
1942 births
Sportspeople from Ballymena
Ballymena United F.C. players
English Football League players
Sunderland A.F.C. players
Northern Ireland amateur international footballers
Living people
NIFL Premiership managers
Ballymena United F.C. managers
Northern Ireland youth international footballers
Irish League representative players
Northern Ireland under-21 international footballers
Football managers from Northern Ireland